The Supreme Order of the Renaissance ("Medal of the Nahda") is the second knighthood order of the Kingdom of Jordan.

History 
The order was instituted in 1917 by Emir Hussein bin Ali, Sharif of Mecca. According to correspondence between the British Foreign Office and their agent in Jeddah in 1924,

When Hussein's successor Ali was overthrown by the Sultan of Nejd, his son Abdullah continued to issue the award as Emir of Transjordan.

Grades 
The Supreme Order of the Renaissance is divided in six classes :
 Grand Cordon with Brilliants / Special 1st Class
  Grand Cordon / 1st Class
  Grand Officer / 2nd Class
  Commander / 3rd Class
  Officer / 4th Class
  Knight/ 5th Class
  Medal/ 6th Class

Insignia 
The ribbon is, since 1952, of equal stripes of black, white and green; with a narrow red stripe in the centre of the white stripe.

Between 1917 and 1952, it was made of equal stripes of black, green and white; with a narrow red stripe in the centre of the green stripe.

Recipients 

 Ali Abu Al-Ragheb
 Prince Ali bin Hussein
 Albert II of Monaco
 Ali of Hejaz
 Princess Basma bint Talal
 Beatrix of the Netherlands
 Anton Benya
 Al-Muhtadee Billah
 Angela Merkel
 Lakhdar Brahimi
 Maria Cavaco Silva
 Prince Constantijn of the Netherlands
 Dina bint Abdul-Hamid
 Faisal I of Iraq
 Faisal II of Iraq
 Farouk of Egypt
 Prince Faisal bin Hussein
 Felipe VI of Spain
 Frederik, Crown Prince of Denmark
 Fuad I of Egypt
 Ali Ghandour
 Ghazi of Iraq
 Haakon, Crown Prince of Norway
 Hamad bin Isa Al Khalifa
 Prince Hamzah bin Hussein
 Daoud Hanania
 Prince Hassan bin Talal
 Haya bint Hussein
 Henrik, Prince Consort of Denmark
 David George Hogarth
 Alia Al-Hussein
 Jassim bin Hamad bin Khalifa Al Thani
 Prince Joachim of Denmark
 Prince Edward, Duke of Kent
 Isa bin Salman Al Khalifa
 Khalifa bin Salman Al Khalifa
 Amer Khammash
 Awn Al-Khasawneh
 Princess Laurentien of the Netherlands
 Ahmad Lozi
 Princess Margriet of the Netherlands
 Queen Mathilde of Belgium
 Azrinaz Mazhar Hakim
 Henry McMahon
 Francisco Franco
 Prince Muhammad bin Talal
 Princess Muna al-Hussein
 Shakhbut bin Sultan Al Nahyan
 Prince Nayef bin Abdullah
 Abdul Reza Pahlavi
 Ali Reza Pahlavi I
 Mohammad Reza Pahlavi
 Queen Saleha of Brunei
 Salman, Crown Prince of Bahrain
 Sarah, Crown Princess of Brunei
 Princess Sarvath al-Hassan
 Queen Silvia of Sweden
 Queen Sonja of Norway
 Tareq Suheimat
 Victoria, Crown Princess of Sweden
 Pieter van Vollenhoven
 Ra'ad bin Zeid
 Siti Hartinah 
 Haitham bin Tariq
 Prince Philip, Duke of Edinburgh

References

Sources 
Medals World Index, Jordan: The Supreme Order of the Renaissance (Wisam an-Nahada)

Renaissance, Supreme Order of the
Renaissance, Supreme Order of the
Awards established in 1917
1917 establishments in Asia